Priekule can refer to:

 Priekule, Latvia
 Priekulė, Klaipėda, in Lithuania